Renaissance: Sequential Vol. 2 is the second release from Hernán Cattáneo's Sequential Series in Renaissance Recordings. A competition was created online to give out signed copies from the compilation.

Track listing

Reviews

The album features a two disc house style by Hernán Cattáneo, the compilation features tracks from all over the world, from Scandinavia, Belgium, Germany, Israel, Greece, Argentina, England and the United States. The difference between it and other DJ Mixes is that an intro remix from Hernán Cattáneo and studio team mate John Tonks was included on the first disc, in total there are six exclusive tracks from fellow producers. Between those, Nick Muir's track "Airtight", Oliverio's "The Second Angel Is Here", and Martin Garcia's "Paper Dove" which provided a "(Sequential Mix)", Garcia was the engineer during the production of the album.  Other tracks were "Anime", a creation between Cattáneo and Tonks.

References

DJ mix albums
2007 compilation albums